The Boucs de Megève (official name: Club des Sports de Megève) are an ice hockey team in Megève, France.

History
The club was founded by Jean Motte in 1923, but wasn't officially registered until July 17, 1931. Starting in the 1950s, the team regularly participated in the top-level French league. Their biggest achievement was winning French league title in the 1983-84 season. For the 1986-87 season, the club merged with Sporting Hockey Club Saint Gervais to form Mont-Blanc HC. Due to financial problems of Mont-Blanc HC, the clubs became independent again in 1989. This would last until 2002, when the clubs merged again. Since the re-merger with Mont-Blanc, Megève has consisted solely of a junior section.

Achievements
French champion (1): 1984.

External links
Team profile on eurohockey.com
Official website

Ice hockey teams in France